The Chicago Surface Lines (CSL) was operator of the street railway system of Chicago, Illinois, from 1913 to 1947.  The firm is a predecessor of today's publicly owned operator, the Chicago Transit Authority.

History
The first streetcars in Chicago were horse cars run by the Chicago City Railway Company and the North Chicago City Railway Company around 1858-1861. This method was slow and expensive, and the companies began substituting cable cars in the 1880s. Chicago City Railway was the first in (1881), and with the addition of the Chicago Passenger Railway (1883) and the West Chicago Street Railroad Company (1887), Chicago had the largest cable railway system in the world. The north and west side cable car systems were constructed by an investment syndicate under the direction of Charles Yerkes. 

It was also in the 1880s that electric-powered "trolleys" first became practical. The Chicago companies hesitated at first to install these faster and more efficient systems because of their heavy investment in cable cars. But the smaller Illinois cities and the Calumet Electric Street Railway of the South Side built successful systems, causing the Chicago companies to feel themselves dropping behind. By the mid-1890s most of them had begun the conversion to electricity, which was completed in 1906.

A political conflict dubbed the Chicago Traction Wars arose concerning the franchise and ownership of the city's streetcars.

The 1890s saw the consolidation of many of the Chicago companies, and this reorganization continued into the next century. In 1907 to 1909, the companies were granted franchises pursuant to various ordinances, under which the city reserved the right to purchase the systems.  The Settlement Ordinance of 1907 imposed various operating requirements on two of the underlying companies, the Chicago City Railway Company and Chicago Railways, and established a new bureau, the Board of Supervising Engineers (Chicago Traction), a board of engineers and accountants with responsibilities for assuring compliance with the ordinances, and setting standards for equipment and construction.

Through Routes over the lines of several companies were instituted in 1910, and, for instance, resulted in joint service by the Chicago City Railway Company and Calumet and South Chicago Railway between downtown and 119th Street via Cottage Grove. There was also joint service operated by the South Chicago City Railway and the Hammond, Whiting, and East Chicago Electric Railway into Indiana, with each company collecting its own fare, which continued until the Hammond company converted to buses in 1940.

The continuous reorganization was finally completed by the Unification Ordinance of 1913, which stipulated that all lines would come under the management of a single operating association called the Chicago Surface Lines (CSL), and unified operations commenced in 1914. Four companies formed the CSL: the Chicago Railways Company, Chicago City Railway, Calumet and South Chicago Railway, and Southern Street Railway.   At this time, Chicago had the largest street railway system, the longest one-fare ride, the longest average ride, and the most liberal transfer privileges in the world.

The 1920s saw continued growth despite the increasing competition from the automobile, and while the 1933-1934 World's Fair and wartime demand supported ridership, the underlying companies were bankrupt.  Creditors' bills were filed against the Chicago Railways in 1926 and the Chicago City Railway and Calumet and South Chicago in 1930, resulting in the appointment of receivers and bringing their property into the custody of the Federal District Court. In 1944, the proceedings were converted to those under the Bankruptcy Act, and trustees were appointed. By 10 June 1958 (line 22), the Chicago Transit Authority, which took over the Chicago Surface Lines in 1947, had abandoned the remaining streetcars lines, which were "bustituted." Before that, CSL had introduced gasoline buses for light routes in 1927, and trolley buses to the northwest side starting 17 April 1930. Trolleybus system of Chicago scrapped 25 March 1973.

Fleet
The Chicago Surface Lines was primarily a trolley operation, with approximately 3100 streetcars on the roster at the time of the CTA takeover. It purchased small lots of motor buses, totaling 693 at the time of the CTA takeover, mostly consisting of smaller buses used on extension routes or to replace two-man streetcars on routes such as Hegewisch and 111th Street, because conductors were required to flag streetcars across mainline railroads where there was not a watchman at the crossing. Most postwar PCC cars were scrapped and parts reused in the 6000-series rapid transit cars for the CTA. The trolley bus fleet consisted of 152 vehicles.

Streetcars
A table of passenger railway cars in use during the CSL era is shown below.  Ownership resided with one of the underlying companies: Chicago Railways (CRY), Chicago City Railway (CCR), Calumet & South Chicago Railway (CSC) or Southern Street Railway (SSR).  Other predecessors include Chicago Union Traction (CUT), absorbed into Chicago Railways in 1908, and Chicago & Southern Traction (C&ST), absorbed into Chicago City Railway in 1912.  Following unification many car orders (e.g. 169 Cars, Sedans, PCCs) were split between the various underlying companies.

Electric Trolley Buses
A table of electric trolley buses owned by CSL is shown below.  In 1952 all trolley buses still in service were renumbered by Chicago Transit Authority by adding "9" to the beginning of their number (e.g. 193 becoming 9193).

Motor Buses
A table of motor buses owned by the CSL is shown below.  In September 1944 all existing buses, previously numbered in separate series depending on corporate owner, were renumbered into a unified series.

Routes
The table below shows a basic overview of CSL routes at their height. Many changes to routing and terminals were made at various times. Abandonment dates noted are dates that routes were completely changed over to bus or trolley bus, or eliminated altogether. Many routes were converted in sections. Some routes, notably through routes, that were eliminated prior to the formation of the CSL are not included.

Remnants

The primary remnants of the CSL system are the 77th Street & Vincennes car barns, the Ardmore temporary bus garage, and buildings that were electricity substations. Cable-car survivors include powerhouses at LaSalle and Illinois (NCSR), Washington and Jefferson (WCSR), a small barn on Blue Island east of Western (WCSR), and other structures on Armitage west of Campbell, and Lake Park south of 55th street. Burnside car barn at 93rd & Drexel is still basically intact.  Some cars of CSL and its predecessors are preserved at the Illinois Railway Museum and other museums. Stand-in for CSL PCC "Green Hornet" streetcars (actually streetcars from other cities repainted in CSL colors) operate over the Kenosha Electric Railway in Kenosha, Wisconsin and the F-Market Line in San Francisco, California. CSL Motor Bus 3407 is preserved at the Illinois Railway Museum.  A few CTA bus routes (notably 4 Cottage Grove, 8 Halsted, 9 Ashland, 20 Madison, 22 Clark, and 36 Broadway) still have their original CSL Through Route numbers. One can find rails from the old system around the city, although they have been significantly cemented and often only the tops of the rails can be seen.

Notes

Footnotes

References

External links
 Chicago Surface Line Drawings, 1886-1926 Archives Center, National Museum of American History, Smithsonian Institution.
 Bill Vandervoort's Chicago Transit and Railfan - unofficial enthusiast's site:
 Chicago Surface Lines -- History
 Surface Transit Routes -- Past and Present
 Former Carhouses
 Chicago History Museum: Streetcars Bibliography
 Tom's Trolleybus Pix -- Chicago
 Chicago Streetcar Renaissance -- Proposal for a New Chicago Streetcar System
 History
 Illinois Railway Museum's CTA History Site

Transportation in Chicago
History of Chicago
Streetcars in Illinois
Public transport operators
Defunct public transport operators in the United States
Cable car railways in the United States
Defunct companies based in Chicago
Defunct Illinois railroads
Chicago
Electric railways in Illinois
1913 establishments in Illinois
1947 disestablishments in Illinois